Platyceramus was a genus of Cretaceous bivalve molluscs belonging to the extinct inoceramid lineage. It is sometimes classified as a subgenus of Inoceramus.

Size
The largest and best known species is P. platinus. Its huge but very thin shell often provided shelter for schools of small fish, some of which became trapped and fossilised themselves. The outer shell often provided habitat for its own juveniles, also for oysters such as the epizoic oyster Pseudoperna congesta, and barnacles.

Shells containing pearls have also been discovered.

References

External links

Paleoecology of giant Inoceramidae (Platyceramus) on a Santonian (Cretaceous) seafloor in Colorado
Natural History Museum: Savage Ancient Seas
Invertebrate fossils of Kansas article

Inoceramidae
Prehistoric bivalve genera
Cretaceous bivalves
Prehistoric molluscs of Europe
Prehistoric bivalves of North America
Fossil taxa described in 1932